Varnavas ( "Barnabas") is a town in East Attica, Greece. Since the 2011 local government reform it is part of the municipality Marathon, of which it is a municipal unit. It is part of Athens metropolitan area.

Geography

Varnavas is situated in the hills of northeastern Attica. The main land use is agriculture. The nearest towns are Kapandriti (4 km west) and Grammatiko (4 km southeast). It is 8 km northwest of Marathon and 32 km northeast of the center of Athens. Landmarks include the Historic People's Museum of Varnavas (Istoriko Laografiko Mouseio Varnava).

Its other settlements are Agía Paraskeví (pop. 244), Ágioi Dimítrios kai Panteleímon (189), Moní Metamorfóseos Sotíros (136), Ágios Ioánnis (81), Pouríthi (66), Moní Panagías (32), and Limniónas (7).

Historical population
Varnavas has historically been an Arvanite settlement.

References

External links
Official website 
GTP Travel Pages (Community)

Populated places in East Attica
Marathon, Greece
Arvanite settlements